Binta Diakité (born 7 May 1988) is an Ivorian professional footballer Who plays for Division 1 Féminine club Soyaux. She was part of the Ivorian squad for the 2015 FIFA Women's World Cup.

See also
List of Ivory Coast women's international footballers

References

External links
 
 Profile at FIF 

1988 births
Living people
Ivorian women's footballers
Ivory Coast women's international footballers
Place of birth missing (living people)
Ivorian expatriate sportspeople in Tunisia
Expatriate footballers in Tunisia
Women's association football midfielders
2015 FIFA Women's World Cup players
Ivorian expatriate women's footballers
Ivorian expatriate sportspeople in Belarus
Expatriate women's footballers in Belarus
Ivorian expatriate sportspeople in France
Expatriate women's footballers in France
ASJ Soyaux-Charente players